Shadowboxing is a combat sport exercise in which a person throws punches at the air as though there is an opponent. Practised primarily in boxing, it is used mainly to prepare the muscles before the person training engages in stronger physical activity. Muhammad Ali once performed a now famous shadowboxing routine next to Howard Cosell for ABC's Wide World of Sports television cameras. Black Nova Scotian boxer George Dixon is widely credited for developing the technique.

Details 
Most boxing trainers prefer that their fighters do their shadow boxing before engaging in any other daily exercise routines. The main purpose of this exercise, apart from getting the muscles ready for another activity, is usually to maintain a fighter's rhythm and show the fighter how they would look at that stage of training against a certain opponent. This could be important as fighters envision themselves facing their immediate future opponents: it usually gives fighters an idea of what is, and what is not, to be fixed.

Fighters may want to do some shadowboxing of their own after their daily routines are over, either inside a boxing gym's ring, or wherever they please to at home without having to look directly at a mirror.

Shadowboxing is not limited to boxers and fighters. Many fighters from other striking-based martial arts also use the exercise as part of their daily routines and aside from punches and perhaps dependent upon fighting style they will use kicks, knees, elbows, or even throws. Bruce Lee was often seen practicing his kicks in front of a mirror in his films, and he incorporated other concepts from boxing into his Jeet Kune Do style such as footwork and live sparring. Shadowboxing with swords and other weapons, referred to as a floryshe, is a major training tool among Historical European Martial Arts groups such as the Association for Renaissance Martial Arts and the HEMA Alliance.

Fighters of other more grappling-based martial arts also shadowbox as part of their daily training regimen. Freestyle wrestlers also practice many drills simulating specific wrestling moves without the aid of a partner such as shooting, sprawling, hip switches and bridging.

Styles
The long method involves a shuffle of the feet that rocks the body back and forth. This is a style favored by fighters with long reach, who use more jabs and straight shots.
The short method sees the fighter move his head and body to the left and right, constantly slipping punches and moving in for closer body shots. Joe Frazier and Mike Tyson are among the best examples of fighters who use this method.

References

Boxing
Boxing terminology
Shadows